River Road in Louisiana is the most well-known segment of the Great River Road in the United States. Dotted on each side of the river are antebellum plantation houses. Today, there are also dozens of industrial plants along the route, the health impacts of which have given rise to the name Cancer Alley.

References
 

Roads in Louisiana